Edward Emile Staniowski (born July 7, 1955) is a Canadian former professional ice hockey goaltender who played for the St. Louis Blues, Winnipeg Jets and Hartford Whalers in the National Hockey League. He won the Charlie Conacher Humanitarian Award in 1978-79.

He played 219 games in his NHL career between 1975 and 1985, winning 67, losing 104 and tying 21.  He was a Western Canada Hockey League First Team All-Star in 1975 while playing with the Regina Pats, and was named the inaugural recipient of the CHL Player of the Year Award.

Military career
Ed Staniowski served in the Canadian Forces after retiring from hockey, reaching the rank of lieutenant colonel in the primary reserve. His military career has included "numerous" deployments, including as senior Canadian advisor to the Armed Forces of Sierra Leone.

Career statistics

Regular season and playoffs

International

Awards
 WCHL All-Star Team – 1975

References

External links

1955 births
Living people
Canadian expatriate ice hockey players in the United States
Canadian ice hockey goaltenders
Cleveland Crusaders draft picks
Hartford Whalers players
Ice hockey people from Saskatchewan
Regina Pats players
Sportspeople from Moose Jaw
St. Louis Blues draft picks
St. Louis Blues players
Winnipeg Jets (1979–1996) players